Pholidota can be
Pholidota (plant): a genus of Epidendroideae, Orchidaceae
Pholidota (order): an order in Laurasiatheria